Figments of Experience is a collection of short stories by Gopal Baratham. It was published in 1981 by Times Books International. It contains the following stories:

"Welcome"
"Vocation"
"Love Letter"
"The Experiment"
"The Wafer"
"Wedding Night"
"Tomorrow's Brother"
"The Interview"
"Island"
"Figment of Experience"
"Confidence Trick"
"Ghost"
"Sundowner"
"Ultimate Commodity"
"Cliseemah Caloh"

Editions
  (paperback, 1981)

1981 short story collections
Singaporean short story collections
Times Books books